Henry O'Neill (1908–1939) was an English professional footballer who played as a forward.

Born in Liverpool, O'Neill started his career at Everton, but did not make a first team appearance for the club. After spells at Earle and Runcorn, he returned to the Football League with Cardiff City in 1931, where he made nine league appearances, scoring two goals. In February 1932, he moved to Switzerland to join FC Bern, and later played for Red Star Olympique in France.

When he returned to England, O'Neill also played for Hurst, Stockport County and Wigan Athletic.

In 1939, O'Neill died of cancer at Archway Hospital, Highgate while on a business trip in London.

References

External links
 

1908 births
1939 deaths
English footballers
Footballers from Liverpool
Everton F.C. players
Runcorn F.C. Halton players
Cardiff City F.C. players
Red Star F.C. players
Ashton United F.C. players
Stockport County F.C. players
Wigan Athletic F.C. players
English Football League players
Association football forwards
Deaths from cancer in England